Myer House may refer to:

Morton–Myer House, Boonville, Missouri
Myer House (Dublin, Ohio)
Sterling Myer House, Houston, TX, listed on the NRHP in Texas

See also
Myers House (disambiguation)
Meyer House (disambiguation)
Meyers House (disambiguation)